Văratic is a village in Ialoveni District, Moldova.

References

Villages of Ialoveni District